Just Shapes & Beats is an action rhythm video game developed and published by Canadian indie team Berzerk Studio. It was released on May 31, 2018 for Microsoft Windows and Nintendo Switch, February 24, 2019 for macOS and Linux, May 10, 2019 for PlayStation 4 in the US, and May 30, 2019 for PlayStation 4 in Europe, Russia and Australia. It was also released on June 30, 2020 for Stadia, and on May 31, 2022 for Xbox One and Xbox Series X/S. In this game, players move a colorful shape to the beat of background music and dodge pink shapes.

Gameplay 
Just Shapes & Beats consists of multiple levels based around individual tracks by independent artists in the Dubstep, Trap music (EDM) and chiptune genres, such as Nitro Fun, Danimal Cannon, Tristam, Noisestorm and Pegboard Nerds.

Up to four players each control one small shape, surviving via dodging a variety of attacks, such as huge beams, bouncing waves, snake-like spirals, and pulsating shapes. These attacks appear and move in rhythm to the music, with difficulty increasing the further players progress.

Being struck by one of these attacks causes the player to lose part of their shape, represented by either a cyan square (default shape for a single player), a yellow triangle, a green pentagon or an orange circle, if there are multiple players. Players can take up to three hits in regular levels and six hits during 'boss battles'. If the shape breaks entirely, the game rewinds to the previous checkpoint, or in the case of the boss battles, back to the start. Three breaks within a single level results in a Game Over screen, with the text stating "It's Over" and the cyan square breaking down to pieces. Tapping Enter (PC/Steam), A (Switch), or the Cross button (PS4) multiple times causes the square to fix itself and changes the screen's text to read "It's NOT Over", allowing the player to continue from the beginning of the level. At the top of the screen a large bar with a white triangle at the end serves as a progress bar for each level.

The game offers multiple modes that feature variations on the basic gameplay, such as party mode, playlist, challenge run, and story mode. A Hardcore mode was added in 2019, which adds harder versions of all available levels.

Development 

The first demo of the game was revealed at PAX 2016 and was supposed to be released that summer. During the event, the release date was delayed from late 2016 to early 2017. The game was eventually delayed again, with a launch date of summer 2018. On March 20, 2018, it was announced that the game would also receive a release on the Nintendo Switch.
On June 25, 2021, the studio announced that The Lost Chapter will be added to the game on July 23. The update consists of 5 new tracks, including a remix of Spider Dance from Undertale.

On April 21, 2022, it was announced that the game would receive a release on the Xbox One and Xbox Series X/S consoles on May 31.

Reception 

On review aggregator Metacritic, Just Shapes & Beats has received 83/100, indicating "generally favorable reviews."

Accolades

 PAX Prime, 2014
 Indie Megabooth Alumni 
 PAX East, 2015
 Indie Megabooth Alumni
 SideQuesting Team Choice Award
 Destructoid Best of PAX
 Golden Joystick Awards, 2018
 Best Audio Design nominee
 Best Indie Game nominee
 Independent Games Festival Awards, 2018
 Excellence in Visual Art

References 

Action video games
2018 video games
Nintendo Switch games
PlayStation 4 games
Video games developed in Canada
Windows games
Classic Mac OS games
Linux games
Music video games
Indie video games
Stadia games
Multiplayer and single-player video games
Xbox games